State Road 335 in the U.S. state of Indiana consists of a northern and southern route.

Route description

Southern section
The southern route is about five miles (8 km) long. It connects State Road 64, three miles (5 km) east of New Salisbury, with State Road 135 (its parent route) between New Salisbury and Corydon. Halfway along this road is the town of Crandall.

Northern section
The northern route is a north–south route that connects the rural areas of northwestern Floyd County and southeastern Washington County. Its southern terminus is U.S. Route 150 near Greenville with the northern terminus at Indiana 60 near Pekin. Halfway through the twelve-mile (19 km) route it passes through the tiny town of Martinsburg.

Major intersections

References

External links

 Indiana Highway Ends - SR 335

335
Transportation in Floyd County, Indiana
Transportation in Washington County, Indiana
Transportation in Harrison County, Indiana